Ma Zengyu (Chinese: 马增玉; born 7 May 1983 in Shenyang, Liaoning) is a Chinese basketball player. She plays as a shooting guard. She competed in the Women's basketball tournament at the 2012 Summer Olympics. She plays in Liaoning Hengye, in Shenyang.

References

Chinese women's basketball players
Olympic basketball players of China
Living people
Basketball players at the 2012 Summer Olympics
Basketball players from Shenyang
1983 births
Asian Games medalists in basketball
Basketball players at the 2010 Asian Games
Shooting guards
Asian Games gold medalists for China
Medalists at the 2010 Asian Games
Liaoning Flying Eagles players
Xinjiang Magic Deer players